Testosterone undecylenate (TUe) is an androgen/anabolic steroid medication and androgen ester which is no longer marketed. It was a component of Durasteron and Triolandren, long-acting mixtures of testosterone esters in oil solution that were administered by intramuscular injection.

See also 
 Boldenone undecylenate
 Testosterone propionate/testosterone enanthate/testosterone undecylenate
 Testosterone propionate/testosterone valerate/testosterone undecylenate
 List of androgen esters § Testosterone esters

References 

Abandoned drugs
Androgens and anabolic steroids
Androstanes
Ketones
Testosterone esters
Undecylenate esters